György Majláth may refer to:
 György Majláth (1786–1861), Hungarian statesman
 György Majláth (1818–1883), Hungarian politician